Rackett is an unincorporated community in Garden County, Nebraska, United States. Rackett Grange Hall No. 318, which is listed on the National Register of Historic Places, is located in Rackett.

A post office was established in Rackett in 1910, and remained in operation until it was discontinued in 1944.

References

Unincorporated communities in Garden County, Nebraska
Unincorporated communities in Nebraska